Norvell is both a surname and a given name. Notable people with the name include:

Given name
 Norvell Austin (born 1958), American wrestler
 Norvell P. Cobb (1824–1879), American Civil War officer
 Norvell Coots, American physician, hospital administrator and retired military officer
 Norvell L. Henley (1869–1923), American attorney and politician
 Norvell W. Page (1904–1961), American pulp fiction writer
 Norvell G. Ward (1912–2005), American naval officer

Surname
 David L. Norvell (born 1935), American politician
 Hugh Norvell (1669–1719), Virginia planter, soldier and politician
 James R. Norvell (1902–1969), American jurist
 Jay Norvell (born 1963), American college football coach
 John Norvell (1789–1850), newspaper editor and one of the first U.S. senators from Michigan
 Lipscomb Norvell (1756–1843), American military officer
 Margaret Norvell (born 1860), lighthouse keeper
 Mike Norvell (born 1981), American college football coach
 Patsy Norvell (1942–2013), American visual artist
 Scott Norvell, blogger
 Stevens Thompson Norvell (1835–1911), military officer
 Zach Norvell Jr. (born 1997), American basketball player